The random walk hypothesis is a financial theory stating that stock market prices evolve according to a random walk (so price changes are random) and thus cannot be predicted.

History
The concept can be traced to French broker Jules Regnault who published a book in 1863, and then to French mathematician Louis Bachelier whose Ph.D. dissertation titled "The Theory of Speculation" (1900) included some remarkable insights and commentary. The same ideas were later developed by MIT Sloan School of Management professor Paul Cootner in his 1964 book The Random Character of Stock Market Prices. The term was popularized by the 1973 book A Random Walk Down Wall Street by Burton Malkiel, a professor of economics at Princeton University, and was used earlier in Eugene Fama's 1965 article "Random Walks In Stock Market Prices", which was a less technical version of his Ph.D. thesis. The theory that stock prices move randomly was earlier proposed by Maurice Kendall in his 1953 paper, The Analysis of Economic Time Series, Part 1: Prices.

Testing the hypothesis

Whether financial data are a random walk is a venerable and challenging question. One of two possible results are obtained, data are random walk or the data are not. To investigate whether observed data follow a random walk, some methods or approaches have been proposed, for example, the variance ratio (VR) tests, the Hurst exponent and surrogate data testing.

Burton G. Malkiel, an economics professor at Princeton University and writer of A Random Walk Down Wall Street, performed a test where his students were given a hypothetical stock that was initially worth fifty dollars.  The closing stock price for each day was determined by a coin flip. If the result was heads, the price would close a half point higher, but if the result was tails, it would close a half point lower. Thus, each time, the price had a fifty-fifty chance of closing higher or lower than the previous day.  Cycles or trends were determined from the tests. Malkiel then took the results in chart and graph form to a chartist, a person who "seeks to predict future movements by seeking to interpret past patterns on the assumption that 'history tends to repeat itself'." The chartist told Malkiel that they needed to immediately buy the stock. Since the coin flips were random, the fictitious stock had no overall trend. Malkiel argued that this indicates that the market and stocks could be just as random as flipping a coin.

Asset pricing with a random walk 
Modelling asset prices with a random walk takes the form:

where

 is a drift constant

 is the standard deviation of the returns

 is the change in time

 is an i.i.d. random variable satisfying .

A non-random walk hypothesis

There are other economists, professors, and investors who believe that the market is predictable to some degree.  These people believe that prices may move in trends and that the study of past prices can be used to forecast future price direction. There have been some economic studies that support this view, and a book has been written by two professors of economics that tries to prove the random walk hypothesis wrong.

Martin Weber, a leading researcher in behavioural finance, has performed many tests and studies on finding trends in the stock market.  In one of his key studies, he observed the stock market for ten years.  Throughout that period, he looked at the market prices for noticeable trends and found that stocks with high price increases in the first five years tended to become under-performers in the following five years.  Weber and other believers in the non-random walk hypothesis cite this as a key contributor and contradictor to the random walk hypothesis.

Another test that Weber ran that contradicts the random walk hypothesis, was finding stocks that have had an upward revision for earnings outperform other stocks in the following six months.  With this knowledge, investors can have an edge in predicting what stocks to pull out of the market and which stocks — the stocks with the upward revision — to leave in.  Martin Weber’s studies detract from the random walk hypothesis, because according to Weber, there are trends and other tips to predicting the stock market.

Professors Andrew W. Lo and Archie Craig MacKinlay, professors of Finance at the MIT Sloan School of Management and the University of Pennsylvania, respectively, have also presented evidence that they believe shows the random walk hypothesis to be wrong. Their book A Non-Random Walk Down Wall Street, presents a number of tests and studies that reportedly support the view that there are trends in the stock market and that the stock market is somewhat predictable.

One element of their evidence is the simple volatility-based specification test, which has a null hypothesis that states:

where

 is the log of the price of the asset at time 

 is a drift constant

Lo and MacKinlay have authored a paper, the adaptive market hypothesis, which puts forth another way of looking at the predictability of price changes.

Peter Lynch, a mutual fund manager at Fidelity Investments, has argued that the random walk hypothesis is contradictory to the efficient market hypothesis -- though both concepts are widely taught in business schools without seeming awareness of a contradiction. If asset prices are rational and based on all available data as the efficient market hypothesis proposes, then fluctuations in asset price are not random. But if the random walk hypothesis is valid then asset prices are not rational as the efficient market hypothesis proposes.

References

1964 introductions
Finance theories
Stochastic processes